The city of Baghdad is divided into 89 administrative neighbourhoods, gathered into nine administrative districts.

Districts east of the Tigris (Rusafa)

Rusafa District
 1. Sinek, Al Rasheed Street
 2. Al Khulani Square (also Al Khilani), Al-Wathba Square, Shorjah
 3. Abu Nawas
 4. Orphalia, Bataween
 5. Al-Sa'adoon
 6. Camp Gaylani
 7. Sheikh Omar
 8. Medical City
 9. Bab Al-Moatham
 10. Mustansiriya
 11.Nile
 12.14th July 
 13. Idrissi

Adhamiyah District 
 14. Adhamiyah neighbourhood
 15. Al-Wazireya
 16. Wzirya-industrial
 18. Qahira
 19. Gherai'at
 20. Tunis
 21. Hayy Ur
 22. Sha'ab east
 23. Sha'ab north
 24. Sha'ab south
 25. Rashdiya

Thawra District 
 26. Sadr City neighbourhood
 27. Habbibiya
 28. Ishbiliya neighbourhood

7 Nissan District
 29. Al-Shaab Stadium, Bor Saeid sqr, Al-Shaheed Monument (Martyr's Memorial)
 30. Muthana, Zayouna
 31. Ghadeer, Masaloon sqr
 32.New Baghdad neighbourhood (Baghdad Al jadida), Alef Dar, Al Khaleej
 33. Habibiya, Dur Al Umal, Baladiyat
 34. Mashtal, Ameen, Nafit, Rustomaniya
 35. Fedhailia, Kamaliya
 36. Al Husseinia, Ma'amal, Al Rasheed
 37. Al-Ubedy, Ma'amil 2

Karadah District
 38. Sinaa, Alwiya, Al Wahda
 39. Karradae In
 40. Zuwiya, Al-Jadriya
 41. Karrada out, Arasat, Mesbah
 42. Camp Sarah, Rasheed Camp road
 43. Al Rasheed Camp
 44. Industrial complex in Al-Za'franiya
 45. Seaidya, Rabea'a
 46. Al-Za'franiya

Districts west of the Tigris (Karkh)

Karkh District
 47. Shawaka, Haifa complex
 48. Sheik Maaruf, Shaljia
 49. Salhia
 50. Karadat Maryam
 51. Um Al Khanzeer island, Presidential complex
 52. Al Kindi, Harithiya
 53. Zawra park
 54. old Al Muthanna airport

Kadhimiya District
 55. Utayfia
 56. Kadhimiya 1
 57. Kadhimiya 2
 58. Ali Al Salih, Salam
 59. Hurriya 1-5 (Al-Horaya)
 60. Dabbash
 61. Al-Shu'ala

Mansour District
 62. Qadissiya
 63. Mansour Neighbourhood, Dragh, Baghdad International Fair
 64. Al-Washash
 65. Iskan
 66.14 Ramadan
 67. Yarmouk
 68. Safarat complex, Kafa'at
 69. Al-A'amiriya
 70. Al Khadhraa, Hayy Al-Jami'a
 71. Al-Adel
 72. Ghazaliya East
 73. Ghazaliya west
 74. Baghdad International Airport, Abu Ghraib road

Al Rashid District
 75. Dora refinery
 76. Dora, Athureen, Tua'ma
 77. Al-Saydiya, Dhubat
 78. Al-Saydiya
 79. Bajas, Hayy Al-A'amel
 80. Al-Jihad (Hayy Al-Jihad)
 81. Al Atiba'a
 82. Ajnadin, Hayy Al-Shurtta 4th & 5th
 83. Al furat
 84. Suwaib, Makasib
 85. Resala, Qertan, Ewainy West
 86. Ewairij
 87. Saha, Hor Rejab
 88. Mechanic, Asia
 89. Bo'aitha

See also
List of neighborhoods and districts in Baghdad
Administrative districts in Baghdad.

External links
Baghdad Neighborhoods Map by nytimes

 
 
Baghdad